In France, various types of institution have the term "University" in their name. These include the public universities, which are the autonomous institutions that are distinguished as being state institutes of higher education and research that practice open admissions, and that are designated with the label "Université" by the French ministry of Higher Education and Research. These also include the communities of universities and institutions (COMUEs), which are degree-granting federated groups of universities and other institutes of higher education. The COMUEs replace the earlier Pôles de recherche et d'enseignement supérieur (PRES), which were groupings of universities and institutes of higher education that existed from 2007 to 2013. As opposed to the PRES, the COMUEs can grant degrees in their own names.

Other types of French university-like institutions can be found in the list of colleges and universities in France; these include the national polytechnic institutes, the grandes écoles (among which are the three universities of technology), and private universities, such as the Catholic universities, the Protestant universities, the private secular universities, and the American University of Paris.

List of public universities in France 

As of 16 February 2021, there are 67 public universities in France:

List of communities of universities and institutions (COMUEs) in France 
As of 5 May 2021, there are eight university groups known as COMUEs, or communities of universities and institutions, in France:

List of historical or other universities 
Historically, France has had city-wide public university systems:
 University of Clermont-Ferrand
 University of Paris
 University of Grenoble
 University of Lyon
 
 University of Rennes
 Université européenne de Bretagne
 Louis Pasteur University (now part of the University of Strasbourg)
 Marc Bloch University (now part of the University of Strasbourg)
 Robert Schuman University (now part of the University of Strasbourg)
 University of Toulouse
 UniverSud Paris
 Lille 1, Lille 2, Lille 3 (now part of the University of Lille)

See also
 List of colleges and universities in France
 List of colleges and universities by country
 Pôle de recherche et d'enseignement supérieur
 Grandes écoles
 Education in France
 Franco-German University

Notes and references

Educational institutions in France
01
 Public